Her Little Majesty (Swedish: Hennes lilla majestät) is a 1939 Swedish comedy drama film directed by Schamyl Bauman and starring Joachim Holst-Jensen, Sonja Wigert and Anders Henrikson. It was a remake of the 1925 film of the same title. It was shot at the Centrumateljéerna Studios in Stockholm and on location in Oslo. The film's sets were designed by the art director Arthur Spjuth.

Main cast
 Joachim Holst-Jensen as Consul General Hauge 
 Sonja Wigert as Marianne, daughter of the Consul 
 Anders Henrikson as Vicar Ahlman 
 Gösta Cederlund as Doctor Bergfelt 
 Carl Barcklind as Bishop Wicander 
 Gunnar Höglund as Gunnar 
 Aurore Palmgren as Maria 
 Julia Cæsar as Augusta 
 Carl Deurell as Johan Ljunggren 
 Sigge Fürst as a car salesman 
 Axel Högel as a car repairman
 Anna Olin as Mrs. Lindblom

References

Bibliography 
 Per Olov Qvist & Peter von Bagh. Guide to the Cinema of Sweden and Finland. Greenwood Publishing Group, 2000.

External links 
 

1939 films
1939 comedy-drama films
Swedish comedy-drama films
1930s Swedish-language films
Films directed by Schamyl Bauman
Swedish black-and-white films
1930s Swedish films